Austrodaphnella is a genus of sea snails, marine gastropod mollusks in the family Raphitomidae.

Species
Species within the genus Austrodaphnella include:
 Austrodaphnella alcestis (Melvill, 1906)
 Austrodaphnella clathrata Laseron, 1954
 Austrodaphnella torresensis Shuto, 1983
 Austrodaphnella yemenensis Bonfitto et al., 2001

References

 Laseron, C. 1954. Revision of the New South Wales Turridae (Mollusca). Australian Zoological Handbook. Sydney : Royal Zoological Society of New South Wales pp. 56, pls 1–12.
 Powell, A.W.B. 1966. The molluscan families Speightiidae and Turridae, an evaluation of the valid taxa, both Recent and fossil, with list of characteristic species. Bulletin of the Auckland Institute and Museum. Auckland, New Zealand 5: 1–184, pls 1–23 [124, pl. 19,

External links
  Bouchet, P.; Kantor, Y. I.; Sysoev, A.; Puillandre, N. (2011). A new operational classification of the Conoidea (Gastropoda). Journal of Molluscan Studies. 77(3): 273-308
 Worldwide Mollusc Species Data Base: Raphitomidae
 
 Bonfitto, A., Sabelli, B. & Morassi, M. (2001) Austrodaphnella yemenensis new species (Gastropoda: Turridae) from Yemen, Red Sea, with notes on A. alcestis (Melvill, 1906). The Nautilus, 115, 84–89: with description of the genus.

 
Raphitomidae
Gastropod genera